The Greater Cairo Region (GCR) is a metropolitan area centered around Cairo, Egypt. It comprises the entirety of the Cairo Governorate, the cities of Imbaba and Giza in the Giza Governorate, and the city Shubra El Kheima in Qalyubia Governorate. Its definition can be expanded to include peri-urban areas and a number of new planned towns founded in the desert areas east and west of Cairo. The Greater Cairo Region is also officially defined as an economic region consisting of the Cairo, Giza, and Qalyubia Governorates. Within Greater Cairo lies the largest metropolitan area in Egypt, the largest urban area in Africa, the Middle East, and the Arab world, and the 6th largest metropolitan area in the world.

In its larger definition, the area includes all cities in the Cairo Governorate (Cairo, New Cairo, Badr, Shorouk, 15th of May, the New Administrative Capital, and Capital Gardens) as well as the main cities of the Giza Governorate (Giza, 6th of October, New 6th of October, October Gardens, Sheikh Zayed, and New Sphinx) and Shubra El Kheima and Obour in the Qalyubia Governorate. According to an estimate based on United Nations projections, the area had a population of 22,183,000 in 2023. In 2012, when the area's population was estimated at 20.5 million, the population density within Cairo Governorate was estimated at 45,000 per square kilometer (117,00 per square mile).

Climate
The Greater Cairo Area and its surrounding region is classified as hot desert climate (BWh) in Köppen-Geiger classification, as all of Egypt. Cairo and its surrounding region have very similar day to day temperatures; however, the less populated parts at the east and the west do not have the urban heat, which makes them more prone to have soft hail.

Urban issues

60% of all informal houses in Egypt are located in the Greater Cairo area.

Main cities
 Cairo
 Giza
 Shubra El Kheima

Satellite cities/ new towns
 6th of October
 New 6th of October
 October Gardens (Hadayek October)
 New Sphinx
 Sheikh Zayed City
  Badr
 New Cairo 
 New Administartive Capital
 15th of May
 El Shorouk
 Obour (city)

Sometimes included
 10th of Ramadan (city)

See also
 Cairo Metro
 List of radio stations in Greater Cairo

References

 
Metropolitan areas of Egypt
Geography of Cairo
Nile Delta